This is a list of submissions to the 38th Academy Awards for Best Foreign Language Film. The Academy Award for Best Foreign Language Film was created in 1956 by the Academy of Motion Picture Arts and Sciences to honour non-English-speaking films produced outside the United States. The award is handed out annually, and is accepted by the winning film's director, although it is considered an award for the submitting country as a whole. Countries are invited by the Academy to submit their best films for competition according to strict rules, with only one film being accepted from each country.

For the 38th Academy Awards, fifteen films were submitted in the category Academy Award for Best Foreign Language Film. Hungary submitted a film to the competition for the first time. The titles highlighted in blue and yellow were the five nominated films, which came from Czechoslovakia, Greece, Italy, Japan and Sweden. On April 18, 1966, Czechoslovakia became the first Eastern Bloc country to win the Oscar, which it did for the Slovak-language The Shop on Main Street, a dark comedy-drama about the relationship between an elderly Jewish woman and a local village man during the Nazi pogroms in World War II-era Slovakia.

Submissions

References

Sources
 Margaret Herrick Library, Academy of Motion Picture Arts and Sciences

38